Zig Zag is a Portuguese children's programming block broadcast daily on RTP2, RTP1 and RTP Internacional from Portugal. It airs programming that is targeted for young people (children and teenagers) from ages 3–17. It airs daily on the weekdays from 07:00 to 11:15 WET, and again later on in the day from 16:00 to 20:05 WET. It airs programming in Portuguese.

Broadcast Area 
As many other RTP Television Stations, Zig Zag airs internationally in different countries. Note that all of its programming still airs in European Portuguese.

North America 
RTP2 ZigZag airs in North America, as part of its international broadcast on RTP Internacional.
 United States of America
 Canada

South America 
 Brazil
 Colombia
 Ecuador
 Venezuela
 Guyana
 Suriname
 Uruguay
 Chile
 Argentina
 Peru

Africa 
See RTP África, and Portuguese Africa.
 Cape Verde
 Mozambique
 São Tomé and Principe
 Angola
 Guinea-Bissau
 Equatorial Guinea

Asia 
 Macau
 Others

Europe 
 Portugal
 Others

Oceania 
 Australia
 New Zealand
 Pacific Islands

Programming 
RTP2 ZigZag offers a wide range of programming for children and teenagers from ages 3–17.
 Fireman Sam (O Bombeiro Sam)
 Clifford the Big Red Dog (Clifford, o Cão Vermelho)
 Noonbory and the Super Seven (Noonbory e os Super Sete)
 Jelly Jamm
 The Koala Brothers (Os Irmãos Koala)
 Shima Shima Tora no Shimajiro (as aventuras de shimajiro)
FloopaLoo, Where Are You? (Floopaloo, Onde Estás Tu?)
 Kody Kapow
 Bear in the Big Blue House (O Urso da Casa Azul)
 Ella Bella Bingo Bing
 Vipo: Adventures of the Flying Dog (Vipo, As Aventuras do Cão Voador) Vipo: Surviving Time Island (Vipo e os Amigos na Ilha do Tempo) Dragon Hunters (Caçadores de Dragões) The Puzzle Place (Puzzle Parque) The Little Prince (O Principezinho) Little Robots (Mini Robôs) YooHoo & Friends (YooHoo e Amigos) Mickey Mouse Clubhouse (A Casa do Mickey Mouse) Wabbit (Bugs!) Peanuts
 Peanuts specials The Charlie Brown and Snoopy Show (O Espetáculo do Charlie Brown e do Snoopy) The Garfield Show (Garfield) Sally Bollywood: Super Detective (Sally Bollywood) The Epic Tales of Captain Underpants (As Histórias Épicas do Capitão Cuecas) The Looney Tunes Show ToddWorld (O Mundo de Todd) Maya, the Bee (A Abelha Maia) Vic, the Viking (Vicky) Be Cool, Scooby-Doo! (Scooby-Doo!) Boo!
 Lola and Virginia (Lola e Virgínia) Sandra, the Fairytale Detective (Sandra, a Detetive de Contos) Contraptus (Engenhocas) Earth to Luna! (O Mundo de Luna!) The Country Mouse and the City Mouse Adventures (Rato do Campo e Rato da Cidade) The Tom and Jerry Show (Tom e Jerry [1st season]/O Show de Tom e Jerry [2nd season]) Wild Grinders Chuck's Choice (O Carlos Escolhe) Wolfblood (Sangue de Lobo) Corneil and Bernie (Corneil e Bernie) Thomas & Friends (Thomas e os Seus Amigos) Lunar Jim'' Nutri Ventures – The Quest for the 7 Kingdoms (NutriVentures: Em Busca dos 7 Reinos) Peep and the Big Wide World (O Curioso Mundo de Pio) Shaun the Sheep (A Ovelha Choné) Paper Port (Porto Papel) Powerpuff Girls Z (Super Poderosas) Gawayn Caillou (Ruca) Mushiking: The King of Beetles (Os Guardiães da Floresta Mushiking) Kaiketsu Zorori (Zorori, o Fantástico) Monica's Gang (Turma da Mónica) [in the original Brazilian Portuguese version] Wow! Wow! Wubbzy! Angelo Rules (As Regras do Ângelo) Miraculous: Tales of Ladybug & Cat Noir (As Aventuras de Ladybug) Little People
 Sherlock Yack SpongeBob SquarePants Peg + Cat (Peg e o Gato) Arthur (Artur) Clay Kids The Adventures of Blinky Bill (Blinky Bill) Blinky Bill
 Guess How Much I Love You (Adivinha o Quanto Eu Gosto de Ti) Postman Pat (O Carteiro Paulo) Little Einsteins Mama Mirabelle's Home Movies (Mãe Mirabelle) Jakers! The Adventures of Piggley Winks (Pigi e os Seus Amigos) Pinky and the Brain (Pinky e o Brain) Pet Alien (Pet Alien, Amigos do Outro Mundo) WordGirl (Super Sabina) Ovide and the Gang (Ovídeo e Companhia) Franky Snow Histeria! (Histeria) Max Adventures (As Aventuras do Max) Geronimo Stilton
 Mike, the Knight (Mike, o Cavaleiro) Angelina Ballerina: The Next Steps (Angelina Bailarina) The Mr. Men Show (O Super Apresentador) Total Drama Island (Ilha dos Desafios) Total Drama Action (Drama Total em Acção) Total Drama World Tour (Drama Total - À Volta do Mundo) Total Drama: Revenge of the Island (Drama Total: A Vingança da Ilha/A Vingança da Ilha dos Desafios) Total Drama: All Stars (Drama Total: All Stars) Total Drama: Pahkitew Island (Drama Total: Ilha Pahkitew) The Cat in the Hat Knows a Lot About That! (O Gato da Cartola) Ooglies
 Horrid Henry (Henrique, o Terrível) Horrible Histories (Histórias Horríveis) Dani's House (A Casa da Dani) Tom and Jerry Tales (As Aventuras de Tom e Jerry) Ruby Gloom (Assombrosa Ruby/Rubi Assombrosa) Fanboy & Chum Chum Zombie Hotel Leon
 Chaplin & Co (Chaplin) Ozie Boo! (No País dos Ozie Boo) Glumpers The Adventures of Marco & Gina (As Aventuras de Marco e Gina) Monster Allergy (Alergia Monstra) Sergeant Stripes (Sargento Riscado) Everything's Rosie (Tudo é Rosie) Chrono Kids Gombby's Green Island (Gombby) Handy Manny (Manny Mãozinhas) Cloudbabies (Os Nuvinhas) Martin Morning (Martim Manhã) Pitt & Kantrop (Zé e Kantropo) The Eggs (Os Ovos: Aventuras no Looneyverse) Os Bolechas (Os Bochechas) Tip, the Mouse (O Rato Renato) Dinosaur Train (O Comboio dos Dinossauros) Sesame Workshop Sid, the Science Kid (Sid Ciência) CJ, the DJ (CJ, a DJ) Zeke's Pad (O Tablete do Zeca) Firehouse Tales (Bombeiros Sobre Rodas) LazyTown (Vila Moleza) The Busy World of Richard Scarry (O Mundo de Richard Scarry) The Adventures of Tintin
 Hank Zipzer
 Titeuf Cloudy with a Chance of Meatballs (Chovem Almôndegas) Captain Biceps (Capitão Bíceps) Pumpkin Reports (Missão Abóbora) Grizzy and the Lemmings (Grizzy e os Lemingues) Captain Tsubasa (Campeões, a Caminho da Glória) [the original and Road to 2002 series] Minuscule (Minúsculo) Camp Lakebottom (Campo Lakebottom) Little Lunch (O Pátio) Wissper Chloe's Closet (Armário da Clara) Daniel Tiger's Neighborhood (Daniel Tigre) Ricky Sprocket: Showbiz Boy (Ricky Artista) Origanimals (Origanimais) 3 Amigonauts (3 AmigoNautas) Dogstar (Cão do Espaço) Hi Hi Puffy AmiYumi Teen Titans
 Cloudy with a Chance of Meatballs (Chovem Almôndegas) Little Princess (A Princesinha) Bubble Bip Olivia
 1001 Nights (1001 Noites) Missy Mila Twisted Tales (Emília, a Contadora de Histórias) Robin Hood: Mischief in Sherwood (Robin dos Bosques - Travessuras em Sherwood) Young Justice (Jovens Justiceiros) Scooby-Doo! Mystery Incorporated (Scooby-Doo: Mistérios S.A.) Pororo the Little Penguin (Pororo, o Pequeno Pinguim) Numberblocks''

References 

Portuguese children's entertainment
Rádio e Televisão de Portugal original programming